The Sydney Tramway Museum (operated by the  South Pacific Electric Railway) is Australia's oldest tramway museum and the largest in the southern hemisphere. It is located at Loftus in the southern suburbs of Sydney.

History

Construction of the museum at its original site on the edge of the Royal National Park commenced in August 1956. It was officially opened in March 1965 by NSW Deputy Premier Pat Hills. The facilities were basic, initially a four-track shed built with second hand materials and approximately 800 metres of running track.

In 1975, the Government of New South Wales approved the museum moving to a new site across the Princes Highway adjacent to Loftus railway station. Construction commenced in April 1980, with the first trams transferred from the old site in November 1982. It officially opened on 19 March 1988. The former Railway Square tramway shelter that had been disassembled in 1973 was reassembled. The last tram left the Royal National Park in May 1989.

In 1989, a traverser from Comeng's Granville factory was purchased. Following CityRail closing the two kilometre Royal National Park line in 1991, the museum was able to commence operating services on the line on 1 May 1993.

In 2001, the museum was the recipient of the YMCA facade, that was previously located at the corner of Pitt and Bathurst Street in the Sydney central business district. The facade was relocated by Meriton to make way for a new building being constructed at the same location. This huge impressive sandstone structure dating from the 1880s makes a spectacular backdrop when entering the museum complex from the front gates. The building is not finished yet, and is still being worked on as funding permits. The gates from the original Gladesville Bridge were installed as the depot gates in 2010.

On 23 October 2015, the museum storage shed was broken into by graffiti artists and caught fire. Located off the main museum site, at the Museums original location in the Royal National Park near Loftus Oval, the shed housed the museum's reserve collection of six trams, four buses and a double-decker bus chassis dating to 1937. The shed and contents were destroyed in the blaze.

The 2018 film Ladies in Black had both live action scenes and film stock for CGI segments filmed around the Railway Square Waiting Shed that is located in the southern end of the museum site.

Operations
The museum has an extensive collection of trams from Sydney and other cities in Australia, as well as from other places around the world. The museum operates  of track. The second runs  to the south and utilises the Royal National Park branch railway line that was constructed in 1886 and closed by CityRail in June 1991.

In 1993, the museum converted the line to tramway standards and connected it to the then existing Sutherland line to establish what is now a popular means of access to the world's second oldest national park. The line terminates at Royal National Park railway station.

The museum opens and operates trams on Wednesdays, Sundays, public holidays (except Christmas Day) and on selected weekdays during school holidays.

The Sydney Tramway Museum is run entirely by volunteers and self funds its day-to-day activities, restorations, maintenance and construction programs from gate takings and donations from the generous public.

Preservation

Publications
The Sydney Tramway Museum publishes Trolley Wire on behalf of most tramway museums around the country. Published quarterly, it carries articles on tramways around the world and news from the various Australasian heritage tramways.

Engineering heritage award 
The museum received a Historic Engineering Marker from Engineers Australia as part of its Engineering Heritage Recognition Program.

References

External links

 Sydney Tramway Museum website

Heritage railways in Australia
Museums established in 1965
Tramway Museum
Railway museums in New South Wales
Recipients of Engineers Australia engineering heritage markers
Tourist railways in New South Wales
Trams in Sydney
Tram museums
Transport museums in New South Wales